The Rough Guide to the Music of Cuba is a world music compilation album originally released in 1998. Part of the World Music Network Rough Guides series, the album spotlights the music of Cuba, with such genres as danzón, Cuban jazz, and son. Phil Stanton, co-founder of the World Music Network, produced the album. This was the first of two similarly named albums: the second edition was released in 2009.

Critical reception

The album received positive reviews. Writing for AllMusic, Adam Greenberg praised the diversity and quality of the tracks, calling it a "wonderful" starting-point, but mentioning that there are better choices for those pursuing specific genres. Michaelangelo Matos of the Chicago Reader compared the release to The Rough Guide to Salsa, calling this one "slower", "sexier", and "funkier".

Track listing

References 

1998 compilation albums
World Music Network Rough Guide albums
Compilation albums by Cuban artists